Five ships (and one submarine under construction) of the Royal Navy have been named HMS Agamemnon, after the legendary Greek king Agamemnon.
  was a 64-gun third-rate launched in 1781. She took part in the Battle of Trafalgar in 1805 and was wrecked in 1809.
  was a 91-gun screw-propelled second-rate launched in 1852 and sold in 1870.
  was an  battleship launched in 1879 and broken up in 1903.
  was a  battleship launched in 1906, used as a target ship from 1920 and sold in 1927.
  MV Agamemnon was requisitioned as an auxiliary minelayer for the Northern Barrage in 1940 and returned in 1946.
  is an  nuclear submarine currently under construction.

Battle honours
Ushant 1781
The Saints 1782
Genoa 1795
Copenhagen 1801
Trafalgar 1805
San Domingo 1806
Crimea 1854–55
Dardanelles 1915–16

See also
 , an early long distance merchant steamship with a fuel efficient compound engine.

Royal Navy ship names